New Hits 99 is a compilation album released in 1999. As a part of the Hits compilation series, it contains UK hit singles from the last few months of 1998 and the first few months of 1999. The album reached number 1 on the UK compilations chart for one week.

Track listing

Disc one
 B*Witched - "Blame It on the Weatherman"
 Blondie - "Maria"
 Whitney Houston - "It's Not Right but It's Okay"
 Steps - "Better Best Forgotten"
 Another Level - "I Want You for Myself"
 Cher - "Strong Enough"
 Tatyana Ali - "Boy You Knock Me Out"
 TQ - "Westside"
 NSYNC - "I Want You Back"
 Robbie Williams - "No Regrets"
 Boyzone - "No Matter What"
 Five - "It's the Things You Do"
 Fatboy Slim - "Praise You"
 Mr. Oizo - "Flat Beat"
 Shanks & Bigfoot - "Sweet like Chocolate"
 Blockster - "You Should Be..."
 M People - "Dreaming"
 Savage Garden - "I Want You"
 Faith Hill - "This Kiss"
 Ace of Base - "Always Have, Always Will"
 Chef - "Chocolate Salty Balls (PS. I Love You)"

Disc two
 The Corrs - "Runaway" (Tin Tin Out remix edit)
 Barenaked Ladies - "One Week"
 Manic Street Preachers - "You Stole the Sun from My Heart"
 The Divine Comedy - "National Express"
 Stereophonics - "Just Looking"
 Garbage - "When I Grow Up"
 Underworld - "Push Upstairs"
 Kula Shaker - "Mystical Machine Gun"
 Supercar - "Tonite"
 Mirrorball - "Given Up"
 Cevin Fisher featuring Loleatta Holloway - "(You Got Me) Burning Up"
 Soulsearcher - "Can't Get Enough"
 Inner City - "Good Life (Buena Vida)"
 Will Smith featuring Larry Blackmon and Cameo - "Candy"
 Busta Rhymes - "Gimme Some More"
 Pras - "Blue Angels"
 Ginuwine - "What's So Different?"
 Kleshay - "Rush"
 Cleopatra - "A Touch of Love"
 Ultra - "Rescue Me"
 Johnny & Denise - "Especially for You"

External links
 Discogs entry for New Hits 99

1999 compilation albums
Hits (compilation series) albums